Fire's Share is a 1978 French drama film directed by Étienne Périer and starring Michel Piccoli, Claudia Cardinale and Jacques Perrin.

Plot

Cast 
 Michel Piccoli  as Robert Hansen
 Claudia Cardinale  as  Catherine Hansen
 Jacques Perrin  as  Jacques Noblet
 Rufus as  Patrick Delbaut
 Roland Bertin  as  Eduard 
 Gabriel Cattand as  William de Wallier 
 Véronique Silver  as  Gisèle 
 Liliane Gaudet as Madame de Wallier
 Hélène Vincent as The widow

References

External links

French drama films
1978 drama films
1978 films
Films directed by Étienne Périer
1970s French-language films
1970s French films